"Play Ball" is a single by the Australian hard rock band AC/DC, and the first single from their 2014 album Rock or Bust. It was first used on 27 September 2014 in a trailer for Major League Baseball on TBS post-season coverage, and the single was released on 7 October.

AC/DC's drummer, Phil Rudd, was absent from the video shoot for the single, and was replaced by the Welshman Bob Richards, who had previously played with Man, Adrian Smith, Asia and Shogun.

The Minnesota Twins play the song at home in Target Field directly after the game's line-up is announced. It plays for about two minutes before the game starts. The Danish basketball team, Svendborg Rabbits, play the song in connection with the game starts at home in The Rabbits House. Also the Austrian football club Grazer AK plays the song before home games.

The song was shortlisted for Song of the Year at the APRA Music Awards of 2015.

Charts

References

2014 singles
AC/DC songs
Song recordings produced by Brendan O'Brien (record producer)
Songs written by Angus Young
Songs written by Malcolm Young
2014 songs
Albert Productions singles
Columbia Records singles